The Caterpillar C27 is a V12 diesel internal combustion engine made by Caterpillar. The engine can produce  at 2100 RPM. The peak torque occurs at an engine speed of 1400 RPM.
This engine began production as Caterpillar 3412. As emissions control was tightened, engine management and combustion chamber is redesigned therefore two different engines emerged: the mechanically controlled C27 and electronically controlled C30. Caterpillar C30 block has been scaled up and C32 emerged. C27 also began to be produced with electronic engine control and management after 2007.

References

Diesel engines

V12 engines
Diesel engines by model